Carmo da Cachoeira is a Brazilian municipality in the south of the state of Minas Gerais. In 2020 its estimated population was 12,182 in a total area of 506 km2.  The elevation is 959 meters.

Carmo da Cachoeira is part of the IBGE statistical microregion of Varginha.  It is 35 km. northeast of that regional center and is just off the important BR-381 highway.  The distance to state capital, Belo Horizonte is 274 km.

Climate
The climate is mile with average temperatures varying between 19 and 25 degrees.  In the summer the maximum can reach 34C and in the winter it can go down as low as 2C.

Economy
The main economic activities are coffee growing and milk production.  Coffee alone was planted in 9,000 hectares (2006).  There was also cultivation of corn (4,000 ha.), beans, sugarcane, and potatoes.  In 2006 there were 532 rural producers with a total agricultural area of 36,221 ha.  Over 6,300 people were dependent on agriculture.  There was one financial institution.

Health
In the health sector there were 4 public and 1 private clinics.  The nearest hospital was in Varginha.  In the educational sector there were 6 primary schools and 1 middle school.

Municipal Human Development Index
MHDI: .744
State ranking: 330 out of 853 municipalities
National ranking: 2,040 out of 5,138 municipalities
Life expectancy: 72
Literacy rate: 84 For the complete list see Frigoletto

See also
List of municipalities in Minas Gerais

References

City government site
IBGE

Municipalities in Minas Gerais